The 2010 Championship League Darts was the third edition of a darts competition — the Championship League Darts. The competition is organized and held by the Professional Darts Corporation, with the 2010 edition having a maximum prize fund of £189,000.

The format of the tournament is similar to the Premier League Darts tournament, also organized by the PDC, except it is contested by a larger pool of players who are split up into a number of groups.

Every match could be watched on one of the ten bookmaker websites who broadcast the competition. The tournament was available globally through the internet, except in the United States of America where it cannot be shown for legal reasons.

Format
The first group consisted of the top eight players from the PDC Order of Merit who were available for the competition. These eight players played each other over the course of a day, receiving two points for each win. All matches were contested over a maximum of 11 legs with a player winning the match on reaching 6 legs. After all players had played each other, the four players with the most points progressed to the semi-finals with the winners of those matches progressing into the final.

The winner of the final progressed to the winners group which took place at the end of the competition. The runner-up, losing semi-finalists and the players finishing fifth and sixth moved into group two, where they were joined by the next three players in the Order of Merit. The format of the second group was the same as the first group with players moving into the third group. In total there were 8 groups before the final group took place.

This format ensures that all players who do not win the group or finish in the last two positions have another chance to qualify for the winners group.

Qualification
Players must have been in the top 29 places in the PDC Order of Merit following the 2010 World Matchplay in order to qualify. The top 31 places were used due to Mervyn King and Raymond van Barneveld withdrawing from the tournament through injury.

PDC Order of Merit following 2010 World Matchplay:

Prize money
The prize money remained unchanged from the previous two tournaments.

Groups 1–8
In groups 1–8 the prize money were as follows:
Group Matches – £50 per leg won
Play-off Matches – £100 per leg won

Winners group
In the winners group the prize money were as follows:
Group Matches – £100 per leg won
Play-off Matches – £200 per leg won

In addition the winners group had separate prizes for the winner, runner-up and losing semi-finalists. These prizes broke down as follows:
Winner – £10,000 and a place in the 2010 Grand Slam of Darts
Runner-up – £5,000 and a place in the 2010 Grand Slam of Darts
Losing Semi-finalists – £2,500 each

Tournament dates
The tournament took place over 9 days throughout September and October 2010. One group was played on each day. The dates were as follows:

Group 1 – Tuesday September 7
Group 2 – Wednesday September 8
Group 3 – Thursday September 9
Group 4 – Tuesday September 21
Group 5 – Wednesday September 22
Group 6 – Thursday September 23
Group 7 – Tuesday October 12
Group 8 – Wednesday October 13
Winners Group – Thursday October 14

The tournament took place at the Crondon Park Golf Club in Essex.

Group 1

 Phil Taylor
 James Wade
 Mervyn King
 Adrian Lewis
 Simon Whitlock
 Mark Walsh
 Colin Lloyd
 Robert Thornton

Group 2

 James Wade
 Adrian Lewis
 Simon Whitlock
 Colin Lloyd
 Ronnie Baxter
 Gary Anderson
 Paul Nicholson
 Co Stompé *

Group 3

 James Wade
 Adrian Lewis
 Ronnie Baxter
 Gary Anderson
 Co Stompé
 Andy Hamilton
 Colin Osborne
 Alan Tabern

Group 4

 James Wade
 Adrian Lewis
 Gary Anderson
 Co Stompé
 Colin Osborne
 Terry Jenkins
 Kevin Painter
 Dennis Priestley **

Group 5

 Adrian Lewis
 Gary Anderson
 Co Stompé
 Kevin Painter
 Dennis Priestley
 Vincent van der Voort
 Wayne Jones
 Wes Newton

Group 6

 Adrian Lewis
 Co Stompé
 Dennis Priestley
 Vincent van der Voort
 Wayne Jones
 Steve Beaton
 Jelle Klaasen
 Jamie Caven

Group 7

 Co Stompé
 Dennis Priestley
 Vincent van der Voort
 Wayne Jones
 Jelle Klaasen
 Denis Ovens
 Mark Dudbridge
 Andy Smith

Group 8

 Co Stompé
 Dennis Priestley
 Wayne Jones
 Jelle Klaasen
 Denis Ovens
 Mark Webster
 John Part
 Michael van Gerwen

 * Mervyn King withdrew from the tournament after Group 1 due to injury, with Co Stompé taking his place in Group 2.
 ** Raymond van Barneveld was due to play in Group 4 but withdrew due to injury, with Dennis Priestley taking his place in the group.

Group one
Played on Tuesday September 7.

Board 1

Board 2

Group Results

Play-Offs

Semi-finals

Final

Group two
Played on Wednesday September 8.

Board 1

Board 2

Group Results

Play-Offs

Semi-finals

Final

Group three
Played on Thursday September 9.

Board 1

Board 2

Group Results

Play-Offs

Semi-finals

Final

Group four
Played on Tuesday September 21.

Board 1

Board 2

Group Results

Play-Offs

Semi-finals

Final

Group Five
Played on Wednesday September 22.

Board 1

Board 2

Group Results

Play-Offs

Semi-finals

Final

Group Six
Played on Thursday September 23.

Board 1

Board 2

Group Results

Play-Offs

Semi-finals

Final

Group Seven
Played on Tuesday October 12.

Board 1

Board 2

Group Results

Play-Offs

Semi-finals

Final

Group Eight
Played on Wednesday October 13.

Board 1

Board 2

Group Results

Play-Offs

Semi-finals

Final

Winners Group
Played on Thursday October 14.

Board 1

Board 2

Group Results

Play-Offs

Semi-finals

Final

References

Championship League Darts
Championship League Darts